Cryphalus ruficollis is a species of bark beetle in the family Curculionidae that lives in North America.

References

Koch Widerberg, M., Ranius, T., Drobyshev, I. et al. Biodivers Conserv (2012) 21: 3035. https://doi.org/10.1007/s10531-012-0353-8

Further reading

 
 

Scolytinae
Articles created by Qbugbot
Beetles described in 1915